Pavel Loskutov (born 2 December 1969 in Valka, Latvia) is a former Estonian long-distance runner who specialized in marathon races. He has competed in the Olympic marathon race four times consecutively, from the 1996 Atlanta Olympics to the 2008 Beijing Games.

Biography
In 2001, he won the Göteborgsvarvet half marathon in Gothenburg with a time of 1:03:00. Loskutov finished as the runner-up of the Paris Marathon in 2002 and went on to win a silver medal later that year at the 2002 European Championships in 2:13:18 hours. He was the winner of the JoongAng Seoul Marathon in 2003 and 2004. He also has won half-marathon at the 2008 Riga Marathon. He retired from competition in 2010.

Achievements

Personal bests
5,000 metres – 13:54.87 (2001)
Half marathon – 1:03:00 (2001) NR
Marathon – 2:08:53 (2002) NR

References

External links

marathoninfo
End of the road for Estonia’s Loskutov from European Athletics

1969 births
Living people
People from Valka
Estonian male long-distance runners
Estonian male marathon runners
Athletes (track and field) at the 1996 Summer Olympics
Athletes (track and field) at the 2000 Summer Olympics
Athletes (track and field) at the 2004 Summer Olympics
Athletes (track and field) at the 2008 Summer Olympics
Olympic athletes of Estonia
European Athletics Championships medalists
Frankfurt Marathon male winners
World Athletics Championships athletes for Estonia
Estonian male cross country runners